Urban Rail Transport S.A., commonly abbreviated as STASY, is a Greek public transport operator of the Athens Metro and the Athens Tram. It is the metro and tram subsidiary of Transport for Athens (OASA), and is responsible for the operation and maintenance of the metro and tram network, including rolling stock, 59 tram stops, and 62 of the 66 metro stations.

STASY was created in 2011, as a merger of the Athens–Piraeus Electric Railways (ISAP), the Attiko Metro Operation Company (AMEL), and Tram S.A., and its logo is an amalgamation of the oval-shaped format of ISAP's logo, and the blue and green colours from AMEL's logo.

History 

On 28 February 2011, the Greek Government enacted Law 3920/2011, which allowed the Attiko Metro Operation Company (AMEL) to merge with the Athens–Piraeus Electric Railways (ISAP) and Tram S.A. to form Urban Rail Transport S.A., or STASY as it is commonly known. The merged company, which came into effect on 17 June 2011 under Ministerial Decree 28737/2637, became a subsidiary of Transport for Athens (OASA). ISAP's headquarters at 67 Athinas Street, near Omonoia Square, became the headquarters of STASY.

Three different companies used to operate and maintain the Athens Metro and Athens Tram network before the creation of STASY:
 Line 1 of the Metro used to be operated by the Athens–Piraeus Electric Railways (ISAP): ISAP was created as a public company on 1 January 1976, to replace the privately-owned Hellenic Electric Railways Company (EIS). ISAP came under the authority of OASA in 1998.
 Lines 2 and 3 of the Metro used to be operated by the Attiko Metro Operation Company (AMEL): AMEL was created on 15 February 2001, as an operational subsidiary of public transport developer and constructor Attiko Metro, instead of OASA.
 The Athens Tram used to be operated by Tram S.A.. Founded in March 2001, Tram S.A. was also a subsidiary of Attiko Metro, instead of OASA.

Operations 

STASY is responsible for the operation and maintenance of the Athens Metro and the Athens Tram, including the infrastructure, rolling stock, 59 tram stops and 62 of the 66 metro stations.

See also 

 Attiko Metro
 OASA (Transport for Athens)

References 

Transport in Athens
Railway companies of Greece
Railway companies established in 2011
Rail transport in Attica
2011 establishments in Greece
Greek companies established in 2011